The president of Iceland is the head of state of Iceland. The incumbent is Guðni Thorlacius Jóhannesson, who is now in his second term as president, elected in 2016 and re-elected in 2020.

Vigdís Finnbogadóttir assumed Iceland's presidency on 1 August 1980, she made history as the first elected female head of state in the world.

The president is elected to a four-year term by popular vote, is not term-limited, and has limited powers. The presidential residence is situated in Bessastaðir in Garðabær, near the capital city Reykjavík.

Origin
When Iceland became a republic in 1944 by the passing of a new constitution the position of King of Iceland was simply replaced by the president of Iceland. A transitional provision of the new constitution stipulated that the first president be elected by the Parliament.

Etymology

The term for president in Icelandic is forseti. The word forseti means one who sits foremost (sá sem fremst situr) in Old Norse/Icelandic or literally fore-sitter. It is the name of one of the Æsir, the god of justice and reconciliation in Norse mythology. He is generally identified with Fosite, a god of the Frisians.

Powers and duties

Executive powers

Cabinet
The president appoints ministers to the Cabinet of Iceland, determines their number and division of assignments. Ministers are not able to resign and must be discharged by the president. The ministers are delegated the president's executive powers and are solely responsible for their actions.

In the aftermath of general elections, the president has the role to designate a party leader (the one that the president considers most likely to be able to form a majority coalition government) to formally start negotiations to form a government. Sveinn Björnsson and Ásgeir Ásgeirsson played highly active roles in the formation of governments, attempting to set up governments that suited their political preferences, whereas Kristján Eldjárn and Vigdís Finnbogadóttir were passive and neutral as to individuals and parties comprising the government.

State Council
The president and the Cabinet meet in the State Council. The Cabinet must inform the president of important matters of the state and drafted bills. During meetings the Cabinet may also suggest convening, adjourning or dissolving the Parliament.

Prosecution and pardoning
The president can decide that the prosecution for an offense be discontinued and can also grant pardon and amnesty.

Legislative powers
Article 2 of the constitution states that the president and the Parliament jointly exercise the legislative power. The president signs bills passed by the Parliament into law and can choose not to sign them, thus in effect vetoing them. Bills vetoed by the president still take effect, should the Parliament not withdraw them, but they must be confirmed in a referendum. Ólafur Ragnar Grímsson (who served 1996–2016) is the only president to have vetoed legislation from Parliament, having done so only on three occasions (2004, 2010, 2011). This power was originally intended to be used only in extremely extenuating circumstances.

The president has the power to submit bills and resolutions to the Parliament which it must take under consideration. Should the Parliament not be in session the president can issue provisional laws which must conform with the constitution. Provisional laws become void if the Parliament does not confirm them when it convenes. No president has ever submitted bills nor resolutions, nor issued provisional laws.

Article 30 of the constitution states that the president can grant exceptions from laws. No president has yet exercised this authority.

Parliament
The president convenes the Parliament after general elections and formally dissolves it. He can temporarily adjourn its sessions and move them if he deems so necessary. Furthermore, the president opens all regular sessions of the Parliament each year.

Ceremonial duties
The president is the designated grand master of the Order of the Falcon.

Detailed powers

Compensation
The president receives a monthly salary of 2,480,341 ISK. Article 9 of the constitution states the salary cannot be lowered for an incumbent president.

Residence
Article 12 of the constitution states that the president shall reside in or near Reykjavík. Since inception the official residence of the president has been Bessastaðir which is in Álftanes.

Eligibility
Articles 4 and 5 of the constitution set the following qualifications for holding the presidency:
 meet the qualifications specified for parliamentarians
 be at least thirty-five years old
 have at least 1,500 commendations

Succession
Articles 7 and 8 of the constitution state that when the president dies or is otherwise unable to perform his duties, such as when he is abroad or sick, the prime minister, the president of the Parliament and the president of the Supreme Court shall collectively assume the power of the office until the president can resume their duties or a new president has been elected. Their meetings are led by the president of the Parliament where they vote on any presidential decision.

If the office of the president becomes vacant because of death or resignation, a new president shall be elected by the general public to a four-year term ending on 1 August in the fourth year after the elections. Sveinn Björnsson remains the only president to die in office in 1952, triggering a presidential election one year ahead of schedule.

Removal
Article 11 of the constitution lays out the process by which the president can be removed from office. It states that the president does not bear responsibility for the actions of his government and that he can not be prosecuted without consent of the Parliament. A referendum instigated by the Parliament with 3/4 support must approve of his removal. Once the Parliament has approved of the referendum, the president must temporarily step aside until the results of the referendum are known. The referendum must be held within two months of the vote, and, should the removal be rejected by the people, then the Parliament must immediately be dissolved and a new general election held.

A removal from office has not occurred since the founding of the republic.

List
There have been six presidents since the establishment of the republic.

Term: 1 appointed · 2 died in office · 3 uncontested

Timeline
<div style="overflow:auto">

See also
List of rulers of Iceland
List of spouses and partners of Icelandic presidents

References

External links

Presidents of Iceland
Presidents
1944 introductions
Iceland
1944 establishments in Iceland